The Jamaican ibis, Jamaican flightless ibis or clubbed-wing ibis (Xenicibis xympithecus) is an extinct bird species of the ibis subfamily uniquely characterized by its club-like wings. It is the only species in the genus Xenicibis, and one of only two flightless ibis genera, the other being the genus Apteribis which was endemic to Hawaii's islands of Maui Nui.

Description
The species was first described in 1977 based on postcranial bone elements excavated in a cave deposit at Long Mile Cave, Jamaica, by H. E. Anthony in 1919–20. At the time, it was presumed to be flightless based on the incomplete coracoid; its flightlessness was confirmed after a humerus of the same species was found in the Swansea Cave, Jamaica. New fossil finds from two locations, including the Red Hills Fissure, show that the bird has a unique modification of the carpometacarpus rendering it club-like. The metacarpal is enlarged and bowed distally with thickened walls, while the ulna and radius have been modified as well. This was a large ibis, weighing about 2 kg (70 oz).

Clubbed wing function
Ornithologists speculate that the wings were used as weapons, in the manner of a club or flail, similar to the adaptations found in some mantis shrimps (Stomatopoda: Gonodactyloidea) that possess a club-like distally inflated dactyl used to strike prey and other shrimps. Among birds, this adaption seems unique. Adaptations of the wing to fight in birds is an example of contingency in which various bird species find different solutions to the same problem based in chance.

Distribution

The Jamaican ibis was endemic to Jamaica. Bones have been excavated from several caves, including the Long Mile Cave, the Swansea Cave, the Jackson's Bay Cave and the Red Hills Fissure. Bones from Cuba claimed to be of this genus were later identified as those of a limpkin. Jamaica and Cuba have never been linked, so it is improbable that a flightless species could reach a different island.

References

Holocene extinctions
Extinct animals of Jamaica
Threskiornithidae
Fossil taxa described in 1977
Extinct flightless birds
Extinct birds of the Caribbean